Dhakane (Nepali: ढकने), is a type of sweet Pulao, originated from Nepal a dish made from rice. It is widely popular in all parts of Nepal, quite more in eastern Nepal and it is known with different names according to places. Although it is a sweet cuisine, it cannot be served as a dessert, because it is a heavy dish. It is usually served as dinner or lunch in during festivals or special occasions. It is often associated and served along with or alternative of Kheer.

Origin 
It is originated in Eastern Nepal and it is claimed to be originated by Dhakal caste in Nepal. It is still widely popular among Dhakals of Nepal.

See also 
 Kheer
 List of Nepalese dishes
 Momo

References 

Nepalese cuisine
Rice dishes
Types of food